Oconto Falls is a city in Oconto County, Wisconsin, United States. The population was 2,891 at the 2010 census. It is part of the Green Bay Metropolitan Statistical Area.

History
A post office called Oconto Falls has been in operation since 1871. The city was named for falls on the Oconto River.

Geography
Oconto Falls is located at  (44.874989, -88.1429).

The city is separated by east and west sides by the Oconto River.

Demographics

2010 census
As of the census of 2010, there were 2,891 people, 1,251 households, and 753 families living in the city. The racial makeup of the city was 95.9% White, 0.1% African American, 1.5% Native American, 0.4% Asian, 0.3% from other races, and 1.7% from two or more races. Hispanic or Latino of any race were 1.2% of the population.

There were 1,251 households, of which 33.1% had children under the age of 18 living with them, 40.3% were married couples living together, 14.5% had a female householder with no husband present, 5.4% had a male householder with no wife present, and 39.8% were non-families. 33.5% of all households were made up of individuals, and 12.8% had someone living alone who was 65 years of age or older. The average household size was 2.24 and the average family size was 2.81.

The median age in the city was 38.1 years. 24.5% of residents were under the age of 18; 7.8% were between the ages of 18 and 24; 26.8% were from 25 to 44; 23.9% were from 45 to 64; and 17.2% were 65 years of age or older. The gender makeup of the city was 47.7% male and 52.3% female.

2000 census
As of the census of 2000, there were 2,843 people, 1,166 households, and 719 families living in the city. The population density was 1,056.5 people per square mile (408.1/km2). There were 1,231 housing units at an average density of 457.4 per square mile (176.7/km2). The racial makeup of the city was 98.21% White, 0.14% Black or African American, 0.49% Native American, 0.35% Asian, 0.11% from other races, and 0.70% from two or more races. 0.42% of the population were Hispanic or Latino of any race.

There were 1,166 households, out of which 32.5% had children under the age of 18 living with them, 46.6% were married couples living together, 10.5% had a female householder with no husband present, and 38.3% were non-families. 32.6% of all households were made up of individuals, and 15.9% had someone living alone who was 65 years of age or older. The average household size was 2.35 and the average family size was 2.97.

In the city, the population was spread out, with 26.4% under the age of 18, 6.7% from 18 to 24, 28.7% from 25 to 44, 19.0% from 45 to 64, and 19.3% who were 65 years of age or older. The median age was 37 years. For every 100 females, there were 90.8 males. For every 100 females age 18 and over, there were 85.1 males.

The median income for a household in the city was $34,884, and the median income for a family was $41,107. Males had a median income of $32,386 versus $22,616 for females. The per capita income for the city was $17,170. About 5.9% of families and 9.5% of the population were below the poverty line, including 10.7% of those under age 18 and 12.2% of those age 65 or over.

Education

Oconto Falls School District
Oconto Falls High School
Oconto Falls Elementary School
Washington Middle School
Abrams Elementary School
St. Anthony Catholic School
Jefferson Elementary School (closed 1996, demolished 2006)
Spruce Charter School (closed in 2012)

Notable people
Rusty Lemorande - director, screenwriter and actor

References

External links 

Oconto Falls Area Chamber of Commerce
City of Oconto Falls
Oconto Falls Community Library
Sanborn fire insurance maps: 1904 1911 1919

Cities in Wisconsin
Cities in Oconto County, Wisconsin
Green Bay metropolitan area